Hồng Gai is a ward of Hạ Long city in Quảng Ninh Province, Vietnam.

References

Communes of Quảng Ninh province
Populated places in Quảng Ninh province